Marc Duval may refer to:
Marc Duval (painter), French painter
Marc Duval (priest), French Roman Catholic priest